The Zenica Coal Mine is a brown coal mine located in Zenica, Zenica-Doboj Canton.  The mine has coal reserves amounting to 961 million tonnes of lignite, one of the largest coal reserves in Europe and the world. The mine has an annual production capacity of 0.25 million tonnes of coal.

References 

Coal mines in Bosnia and Herzegovina
Zenica